George Herbert Walker IV (born 1969) is an American investment banker. He is the chairman and CEO of Neuberger Berman, one of the largest independent, employee-owned investment management firms. During Walker's tenure, the firm survived the implosion of its corporate parent, Lehman Brothers, was repurchased by the employees and has been amongst the industry's best performers.

Early life
Walker was raised in St. Louis, Missouri. His parents are Kimberly Gedge and George Herbert Walker III, an investment brokerage executive and U.S. Ambassador to Hungary.

He comes from a family of industrialists and financiers, originally from St. Louis, Missouri. Walker's great-grandfather, George Herbert Walker, was the founder of G. H. Walker & Co., a securities firm, which eventually became part of Merrill Lynch. His grandfather, George Herbert Walker Jr., was a co-founder of the NY Mets. His grand-aunt, Dorothy, married Senator Prescott Bush, father of U.S. President George Herbert Walker Bush and grandfather of U.S. President George Walker Bush. 

He went to high school at St. Louis Country Day School in Ladue, Missouri. In 1968, he received an all-expense-paid scholarship from the U.S. Congress and the German Bundestag to study in Germany for the 1986-87 school year. 

Walker went to the University of Pennsylvania where he received the Harry S. Truman Scholarship and was a Benjamin Franklin Scholar. He was also a member of St. Anthony Hall. He graduated Phi Beta Kappa and received a B.S. in finance and a B.A. in history, both .

He also received his MBA as a Palmer Scholar from the Wharton School of the University of Pennsylvania.

Career 
Walker began his career on Wall Street when he joined Goldman Sachs in the Merger Department in 1992. Six years later, in 1998, Walker became one of the youngest partners in the firm's history.  He held several senior positions at Goldman, including co-head of the firm's Wealth Management business, and head of Alternative Investment Strategies. 

President George Herbert Walker Bush appointed Walker to the Jacob Javits and Presidential Scholar Boards for the Department of Education.

Walker was recruited to a rival investment bank, Lehman Brothers, to head its Investment Management Division, of which Neuberger was a part. Following Lehman's bankruptcy and the announcement of the sale of Neuberger, Walker assumed his present position of chairman and CEO of Neuberger Berman.

Personal life 
He is married to the former Nancy Dorn. 

He served on the board of the New School, Lincoln Center for the Performing Arts, Vintage Fund, the University of Pennsylvania Arts & Sciences’ Board of Advisors, and Youth EnterNet. He also served on the Mayor's Fund to Advance New York City. In 2003, he funded the Alan Charles Kors Term Associate Professor of History at the University of Pennsylvania in honor of a former professor.

References

1969 births
Living people
People from St. Louis County, Missouri
University of Pennsylvania School of Arts and Sciences alumni
Wharton School of the University of Pennsylvania alumni
St. Anthony Hall
Goldman Sachs people
Lehman Brothers
American chief executives
American investment bankers